is a prefectural museum of natural history in Nagatoro, Saitama Prefecture, Japan. The museum opened in 1981 and replaced "史" with "の" in its Japanese name in 2006. The collection includes 56 pieces from a Stegodon aurorae skeleton found in 1975, of which there are a further 3 pieces in the Sayama City Museum; both assemblages have been designated a Prefectural Natural Monument.

Publications
  (2007–; vols. 1–)
  (1983–2006; vols. 1–23)

See also
 Saitama Prefectural Museum of History and Folklore

References

External links
  Saitama Museum of Natural History
  Saitama Museum of Natural History

Museums in Saitama Prefecture
Natural history museums in Japan
Nagatoro, Saitama
Museums established in 1981
1981 establishments in Japan
Prefectural museums